Eventing was a monthly eventing magazine published by IPC Media.

History and profile
When it launched in 1985, The Guardian described Eventing as "a tough workhorse aimed at the serious trials riders and budding Lucinda Greens." The magazine was edited by Julie Harding. The magazine ceased publication in June 2015.

References

External links
 

1985 establishments in the United Kingdom
2015 disestablishments in the United Kingdom
Monthly magazines published in the United Kingdom
Sports magazines published in the United Kingdom
Defunct magazines published in the United Kingdom
English-language magazines
Equine magazines
Equestrian sports in the United Kingdom
Magazines established in 1985
Magazines disestablished in 2015